Edward Hugh Brooke (31 December 1916 – 1 November 2002) was a Canadian fencer. He competed in the individual foil and épée events at the 1952 Summer Olympics.

Biography 
In 1942 Brooke graduated Bachelor of Science in chemical engineering from the University of Alberta. That year he moved to Montreal to begin working for the McColl-Frontenac Oil Company, which in 1959 became Texaco Canada Limited. In 1952 he was made chief engineer, and in 1969 was appointed manager of the company's engineering department.

In July 1952, Brooke competed in the foil and épee events at the 1952 Summer Olympics in Helsinki, placing 6th and 5th respectively.

In 1973 Brooke relocated to Calgary. He died in Calgary on 1 November 2002 at age 85.

References

External links
 

1916 births
2002 deaths
People from Didsbury, Alberta
Canadian male fencers
Olympic fencers of Canada
Fencers at the 1952 Summer Olympics
Sportspeople from Alberta
Commonwealth Games silver medallists for Canada
Commonwealth Games bronze medallists for Canada
Fencers at the 1950 British Empire Games
Fencers at the 1954 British Empire and Commonwealth Games
Commonwealth Games medallists in fencing
Medallists at the 1950 British Empire Games
Medallists at the 1954 British Empire and Commonwealth Games